Warren H. Vinton (1825 – March 13, 1907) was an American politician from Maine. Vinton represented Gray, Maine, in the Maine House of Representatives and was elected from Cumberland County to the Maine Senate in five separate elections. In 1878, Vinton was elected Senate President.

A Republican, Vinton ran for governor as an Independent Republican in 1882. He received only 289 votes and finished in 5th and last place to Republican Frederick Robie. Upon losing, Vinton became a Democrat.

Vinton was born Warren Whitefield Bessey, but changed his name in 1846 to Warren Howard Vinton, after a neighbor who raised him. His parents were Warren and Margery Bessey. He died on March 13, 1907, at his house in Gray.

References

1825 births
1907 deaths
Presidents of the Maine Senate
Democratic Party Maine state senators
Democratic Party members of the Maine House of Representatives
People of Maine in the American Civil War
People from Cumberland County, Maine
People from Gray, Maine
1870s in Maine
1880s in Maine
19th-century American politicians